Joel Collier (born December 25, 1963) is an American football executive who is the director of pro personnel for the Atlanta Falcons of the National Football League (NFL). He is the son of Joe Collier, a former defensive coordinator for the Denver Broncos and New England Patriots and head coach of the Buffalo Bills.

Playing career
Collier attended the University of Northern Colorado, where he played football as a linebacker from 1984 to 1987. He was also an academic All-North Central Conference selection.

Coaching career

College
Under head coach Dick MacPherson, Collier began his coaching career as a graduate assistant at Syracuse University in 1988.

NFL
After his two-year stint at Syracuse, Collier moved to the NFL for the 1990 season as an offensive assistant with the Tampa Bay Buccaneers. In 1991, he re-joined MacPherson, then head coach of the Patriots, as an assistant running backs and wide receivers coach until 1992. In 1993, he entered the Patriots' scouting department as a pro scout. From 1994 to 1997, Collier served as a defensive assistant for the Miami Dolphins. In 1998, he became the Dolphins' running backs coach, a position he held until 2004. Prior to the Patriots' 2005 season, he was hired as their secondary coach. He was not retained by the Patriots following their 2007 season. In February 2009, he was hired by Kansas City Chiefs general manager Scott Pioli, a former executive for the Patriots, as assistant general manager. He remained as the Chiefs assistant general manager until Andy Reid turned over most of the staff.

Saint Thomas Aquinas High School
After being let go by Reid in the spring of 2013, Collier decided to volunteer at his son's high school for the 2013 season at Saint Thomas Aquinas High School in Overland Park, Kansas. Collier helped assist the defensive backs. The team went 3–7, including a 1st round loss in the playoffs. Collier shared that he intended to return to coaching in the NFL for the next year.

References

1963 births
Living people
Sportspeople from Buffalo, New York
American football linebackers
Northern Colorado Bears football players
Syracuse Orange football coaches
Tampa Bay Buccaneers coaches
Miami Dolphins coaches
New England Patriots coaches
New England Patriots scouts
Kansas City Chiefs executives